Puerto Quito is a canton in Pichincha Province, Ecuador. It has only one parish, the urban parish of Puerto Quito, which is also the seat of the canton.

References

External links 
 Map of Pichincha Province

Cantons of Pichincha Province